Johannes Trolle Hjelmslev (7 April 1873 –  16 February 1950) was a mathematician from Hørning, Denmark. Hjelmslev worked in geometry and history of geometry. He was the discoverer and eponym of  the Hjelmslev transformation, a method for mapping an entire hyperbolic plane into a circle with a finite radius.
He was the father of Louis Hjelmslev.

Originally named Johannes Trolle Petersen, he changed his patronymic to the surname Hjelmslev to avoid confusion with Julius Petersen. Some of his results are known under his original name, including the Petersen–Morley theorem.

Publications 
Johannes Hjelmslev, Grundprinciper for den infinitesimale Descriptivgeometri med Anvendelse paa Læren om variable Figurer. Afhandling for den philosophiske Doctorgrad, 1897
Johannes Hjelmslev, Deskriptivgeometri: Grundlag for Forelæsninger paa Polyteknisk Læreanstalt, Jul. Gjellerup 1904
Johannes Hjelmslev, Geometriske Eksperimenter, Jul. Gjellerup 1913
Johannes Hjelmslev, Darstellende Geometrie, Teubner 1914
Johannes Hjelmslev, Geometrische Experimente, Teubner 1915
Johannes Hjelmslev, Lærebog i Geometri til Brug ved den Polytekniske Læreanstalt, Jul. Gjellerup 1918
Johannes Hjelmslev, Die natürliche Geometrie- vier Vorträge, Hamburger Mathematische Einzelschriften 1923
Johannes Hjelmslev, Om et af den danske matematiker Georg Mohr udgivet skrift Euclides Danicus', udkommet i Amsterdam i 1672", Matematisk Tidsskrift  B, 1928, pp 1-7
Johannes Hjelmslev, Grundlagen der projektiven Geometrie, 1929
Johannes Hjelmslev, Beiträge zur Lebensbeschreibung von Georg Mohr, Det Kongelige Danske Videnskabernes Selskab, Math.-Fys. Meddelelser, Bd.11, 1931, Nr.4
Johannes Hjelmslev, Grundlag for den projektive Geometri, Gyldendal 1943

 See also 
Hjelmslev's theorem

 References 

Gottwald, Ilgauds, Schlote Lexikon bedeutender Mathematiker, Leipzig 1990

External linksSalmonsens Konversationsleksikon, Salmonsens Konversationsleksikon'', 

1873 births
1950 deaths
20th-century Danish  mathematicians
Geometers
People from Skanderborg Municipality
Academic staff of the University of Copenhagen
Rectors of the University of Copenhagen
Members of the Royal Society of Sciences in Uppsala